The Gorges du Guiers Mort is a canyon located in the French department of Isère, downstream of Saint-Pierre-de-Chartreuse. The river Guiers Mort flows through it.

Guiers Mort
Landforms of Auvergne-Rhône-Alpes